This is a list of topics related to the provinces and territories of Canada, listed by topic type.

Geography

Infrastructure

History

Politics

Other

Summary

See also

Bibliography of Canadian provinces and territories
Outline of Canada
Index of Canada-related articles